KWAI (1080 kHz) is a commercial AM radio station in Honolulu, Hawaii, owned by Radio Hawaii, Incorporated. The station offers a talk radio format, featuring local shows, including paid brokered programming.

The station first signed on the air on January 21, 1972. KWAI broadcasts with power of 5000 watts with its transmitter off Kalani Street in Honolulu. KWAI bills itself on air as "The Mighty 1080." It airs national news from the USA Radio Network at the beginning of most hours.

References

External links
FCC History Cards for KWAI

WAI
Talk radio stations in the United States
Radio stations established in 1970
1970 establishments in Hawaii